A Friendly Call is an oil on canvas painting executed in 1895 by the American painter William Merritt Chase. It was acquired by the National Gallery of Art in Washington, D.C., in 1943 as part of the Chester Dale collection.

The canvas depicts Chase's wife Alice earnestly chatting with a fashionably dressed visitor in the artist's studio at their summer house at Shinnecock Hills, Long Island. The features of the studio are accurately rendered when compared to a contemporary photograph. The use of color and light is reminiscent of the French Impressionists, a style that led to Chase being dubbed the "American Impressionist".

References

1895 paintings
Paintings by William Merritt Chase
Collections of the National Gallery of Art